...And a Time to Dance is a 1983 EP by Los Lobos. It was co-produced by T-Bone Burnett and Steve Berlin (not yet a full-time member of the band) and was the band's first release on Slash Records. The EP brought the band its first wide acclaim. It was voted best EP of the year in the Village Voice'''s influential Pazz & Jop critics poll. Critic Robert Christgau gave the record an "A−" in his Consumer Guide, calling it "good old rock and roll East L.A. style." Trouser Press raved about "a spicy romp (in two languages) back and forth across musical borders few can traverse with such ease," while Rolling Stone'' called it "an infectious dance record that deserves to be heard by rock fans."

The track "Anselma" won the first Grammy Award for Best Mexican-American Performance.
The album was mixed and recorded entirely digitally.

Track listing

Personnel
 David Hidalgo – guitar, accordion, vocals
 Cesar Rosas – guitar, bajo sexto, vocals
 Louie Pérez – drums, vocals
 Conrad Lozano – bass, vocals, guitarrón

Additional personnel
 Steve Berlin – saxophones, production
T-Bone Burnett – production
Recorded and mixed by Mark Linett

References

1983 debut EPs
Los Lobos EPs
Albums produced by T Bone Burnett
Rough Trade Records EPs
Slash Records EPs